The 1939 Michigan State Normal Hurons football team represented Michigan State Normal College (later renamed Eastern Michigan University) during the 1939 college football season. In their 19th season under head coach Elton Rynearson, the Hurons compiled a record of 3–3–1 and outscored their opponents by a combined total of 68 to 64. Joseph V. Pokrywka was the team captain. The team played its home games at Field on the school's campus in Ypsilanti, Michigan.

Schedule

References

Michigan State Normal
Eastern Michigan Eagles football seasons
Michigan State Normal Hurons football